Argument was an Australian sloop of some 8 tons, built in Sydney and registered on 8 October 1800.

In March 1809 Argument, Experiment and Hazard left Pittwater, New South Wales, bound for Sydney with cargoes of wheat. On 17 March, a squall arose and the master of Argument, Benjamin Pate, watched as Hazard was driven ashore and wrecked. Deciding to avoid a similar fate he attempted to run for Broken Bay but missed the entrance and struck Short Reef, where Argument was wrecked. All three people on board — Pate, his hand James Dicey, and a passenger, Mary Kirk — drowned.

References

Ships built in New South Wales
1800 ships
1788–1850 ships of Australia
Merchant ships of Australia
History of New South Wales
Sloops of Australia
Individual sailing vessels
Maritime incidents in 1809
Ships lost with all hands
Shipwrecks of the Northern Sydney Region